Ubiratan "Bira" Pereira Maciel, commonly known as Bira Maciel, or simply Bira (January 18, 1944 – July 17, 2002), was a professional basketball player from Brazil. He was born in São Paulo, Brazil. At a height of 1.99 m (6' 6") tall, he played at the center position. He is often regarded as the best Brazilian center of all time.  He was nicknamed "O Rei" (English: "The King").

Club career
Maciel won the top-tier level club league in Brazil, the Brazilian Basketball Championship, 5 times, in the years 1965, 1966, 1969, 1977, and 1981.

National team career
With the senior Brazilian national basketball team, Maciel won a total of 8 medals at the Summer Olympic Games, FIBA World Cup, and Pan American Games.

Ubiratan  Pereira Maciel played at 5 FIBA World Cups: (1963, 1967, 1970, 1974, and 1978). He totaled 41 games played and 474 points scored during those competitions, and he won a gold medal at the 1963 tournament in Brazil.

Post-playing career
Maciel was named one of FIBA's 50 Greatest Players in 1991. He was awarded the FIBA Order of Merit in 1994. In 2009, he was inducted into the FIBA Hall of Fame, as a player. On April 5, 2010, Maciel was announced as a member of the 2010 induction class of the Naismith Memorial Basketball Hall of Fame, as a player, and was formally inducted on August 13.

References

External links
FIBA Profile 1
FIBA Profile 2
FIBA Hall of Fame Profile
Basketball-Reference.com Profile
Sports-Reference.com Profile
Brazilian Basketball Federation Profile 

1944 births
2002 deaths
Brazilian men's basketball players
1963 FIBA World Championship players
1967 FIBA World Championship players
1970 FIBA World Championship players
1974 FIBA World Championship players
1978 FIBA World Championship players
Basketball players at the 1963 Pan American Games
Basketball players at the 1964 Summer Olympics
Basketball players at the 1968 Summer Olympics
Basketball players at the 1972 Summer Olympics
Basketball players at the 1975 Pan American Games
Basketball players at the 1979 Pan American Games
Centers (basketball)
Esporte Clube Sírio basketball players
FIBA Hall of Fame inductees
FIBA World Championship-winning players
Medalists at the 1964 Summer Olympics
Naismith Memorial Basketball Hall of Fame inductees
Olympic basketball players of Brazil
Olympic bronze medalists for Brazil
Olympic medalists in basketball
Pan American Games bronze medalists for Brazil
Pan American Games medalists in basketball
Pan American Games silver medalists for Brazil
Power forwards (basketball)
Reyer Venezia players
São José Basketball players
Sociedade Esportiva Palmeiras basketball players
Sport Club Corinthians Paulista basketball players
Medalists at the 1979 Pan American Games
Basketball players from São Paulo